Scott and Seringapatam Reefs is a group of atoll-like reefs in the Timor Sea more than  northwest of Cape Leveque, Western Australia, on the edge of the continental shelf. There are three or four separate reef structures, depending on whether Scott Reef Central is counted separately. 

The group is just one of a number of reef formations off the northwest coast of Australia and belongs to Western Australia. Further to the northeast are Ashmore and Cartier Islands, and to the southwest are the Rowley Shoals.

Location and Description 
Much of the reef area dries at low tide, but besides Sandy Islet of Scott Reef South, there are only a few rocks and sandbanks above the high water mark.

Scott Reef South (also Horseshoe Reef or South Reef) is a large crescent-shaped formation that has a rare and unusual double reef crest. Its lagoon, has depths of over  throughout the greater portion.
There is a conspicuous tower on the islet and also a boulder with a height 2.4 m near its northern end.
The reef is composed of a narrow reef-crest that is backed by broad reef flats – much of which becomes exposed at low tide – and a deep central lagoon that is connected to the open sea by two delta-like channels.
Its narrow reef rim encloses a relatively deep lagoon. Much of the reef becomes exposed at low tide. He named the reef for his ship.

Browse Basin Liquefied Natural Gas Development
Browse LNG was a major liquefied natural gas (LNG) project being developed by Woodside Petroleum, and included the Torosa gas field which lies underneath Scott Reef South and Scott Reef North.

Coral Bleaching
Scott Reef was extensively affected by coral bleaching in 2016 (during a global coral bleaching event), which killed approximately 80% of corals. This followed a previous extensive coral bleaching in 1998 during which "up to 80 per cent of Scott Reef corals died" but from which the reef did recover in the subsequent 10–15 years. Heat stress (indicated by NOAA Coral Reef Watch's Degree Heating Weeks metric) was the highest ever recorded in 2016. Nevertheless, given continuing and measurable climate change and the "direct correlation between increased temperatures and coral bleaching", the consequent increasing frequency of coral bleaching warrants concern that Scott Reef may not recover and survive from the 2016 bleaching event.

References

External links

Sailing Directions, Vol. 175
 Arrecifes e islas australianas en el Mar de Timor (Spanish)

Further reading
 Berry, P.F. Ed. (1986) Faunal surveys of the Rowley Shoals, Scott Reef, and Seringapatam Reef, North-western Australia Perth, W.A. : Western Australian Museum, Records of the Western Australian Museum. Supplement, 0313-122X ; no. 25. 

Islands of Western Australia
Indian Ocean atolls of Australia
Reefs of the Indian Ocean
Reefs of Australia